was a stable of sumo wrestlers, one of the Nishonoseki group of stables. In its modern form it existed from March 1987 when it was founded by Kotokaze, a former Sadogatake stable wrestler., until February 2022. The first wrestler from the stable to achieve sekitori status was Tomikaze in July 2000. Initially the stable had a policy of not accepting foreign born wrestlers or college recruits, but this was waived when Chuo University graduate Takekaze personally asked to join in 2002. Their first foreigner was the Mongolian Hoshikaze, who joined in the same year and eventually reached jūryō but was thrown out of sumo after the 2011 match-fixing scandal. The stable absorbed Oshiogawa stable in 2005 ahead of the retirement of Oshiogawa-oyakata, with Wakakirin and Wakatoba among the wrestlers transferring over. As of January 2022, it has 14 wrestlers. The stable produced seven makuuchi or top division wrestlers - Takekaze, Yoshikaze, Wakakirin, Kimikaze, Amakaze, Yago and Tomokaze.

Kotokaze announced on 25 December 2021 that Oguruma stable would close following the January 2022 sumo tournament. The closure officially took place on 7  February 2022, with the  stable's personnel being split between a new Oshiogawa stable run by the former Takekaze, and Nishonoseki stable, with the former Yoshikaze assisting the coaching there.

Ring name conventions
Almost all wrestlers at this stable took ring names or shikona that end with the character 風 (read: kaze), meaning wind or breeze, in deference to their coach and the stable's owner, the former Kotokaze.

Owner
1987–2022: 8th Oguruma (riji, former ōzeki Kotokaze)

Notable former wrestlers
Takekaze (former sekiwake)
Yoshikaze (former sekiwake)
Kimikaze (former maegashira)

Coaches
Nakamura Masatsugu (toshiyori, former sekiwake Yoshikaze)
Oshiogawa Akira (toshiyori, former sekiwake Takekaze)

Assistant
Nishikikaze (sewanin, former makushita, real name Yasuyuki Adachi)

Usher
Rokurō (jūryō yobidashi, real name Kenzō Araki)

Hairdresser
Tokogō (1st class tokoyama)

Location and access
Tokyo, Edogawa ward, Kiyosumi 2-15-5
3 minutes from Kiyosumi-shirakawa Station on the Toei Ōedo Line and Hanzōmon Line

See also
List of sumo stables
List of active sumo wrestlers
List of past sumo wrestlers
Glossary of sumo terms

References

External links 
Japan Sumo Association profile
Homepage in Japanese 

Defunct sumo stables